Jackson Township is one of seventeen townships in Adair County, Iowa, USA.  At the 2020 census, its population was 270.

History
Jackson Township was organized in 1861.

Geography
According to the USGS, it contains three cemeteries: Bryant, Cears and Saint Mary's.

References

External links
 US-Counties.com
 City-Data.com

Townships in Adair County, Iowa
Townships in Iowa
1861 establishments in Iowa